A constitutional referendum was held in Cameroon on 20 May 1972. The new constitution would make the country a unitary state, as opposed to the previous federal system, as well as giving more powers to President Ahmadou Ahidjo. It was passed by 99.99% of voters with a 98.2% turnout.

Results

References

Further reading
 Chem-Langhëë, Bongfen. “The Road to the Unitary State of Cameroon 1959-1972.” Paideuma 41 (1995): 17–25. http://www.jstor.org/stable/40341689.

1972 referendums
1972 in Cameroon
1972
Constitutional referendums